Avi Belkin is an Israeli film director, producer and cinematographer.

Education
Belkin studied art and film at HaMidrasha - Faculty of the Arts in Beit Berl, Israel.

Film career
In 2012, Belkin produced and directed a short documentary film, Paddle Ball, that won first place at the Haifa International Film Festival that year. In 2014, his debut feature film Winding, about the Yarkon River,  won the best film award.

Belkin directed the documentary feature Mike Wallace is Here that follows the life and career of American journalist Mike Wallace (2019) and directed and executive produced a 6 part true-crime documentary series No One Saw a Thing (2019) that tells the story of a small violent town in Missouri.

Filmography

References

External links
 Paddle Ball on Vimeo

Israeli film directors
Israeli male screenwriters
Israeli film producers
Autobiographical articles from June 2015
Year of birth missing (living people)
Living people